Stephen Reynolds is a Canadian film and television director, most noted as the director of the theatrical feature film The Divine Ryans.

His other credits have included Odd Squad, Haven, Combat Hospital, Heartland, This Hour Has 22 Minutes, The Eleventh Hour, Black Harbour, CODCO and Made in Canada.

He has won a Daytime Emmy Award for his directing work on Odd Squad, as well as four Canadian Comedy Awards, three for his work on Made in Canada and one for This Hour Has 22 Minutes, and two Gemini Awards as producer of CODCO (both shared with Michael Donovan, Jack Kellum and J. William Ritchie).

References

External links

Living people
Canadian television directors
Film directors from Nova Scotia
Year of birth missing (living people)
Canadian Comedy Award winners
Daytime Emmy Award winners
Canadian Screen Award winners